TV Lukavac or Radio Televizija Lukavac is a local Bosnian  public cable television channel based in Lukavac municipality, Tuzla Canton. It was established in 2011 when local Radio Lukavac started television broadcasting.

TV Lukavac broadcasts a variety of programs such as local news, local sports, mosaic and documentaries. Program is mainly produced in Bosnian language.

Radio Lukavac is also part of public municipality services.

References

External links 
 Official website of RTV Lukavac 
 Communications Regulatory Agency of Bosnia and Herzegovina

Television channels and stations established in 2011
Television stations in Bosnia and Herzegovina